Kamil Wiktorski (born 12 March 1993) is a Polish professional footballer who plays as a defender for Gloria Buzău. He started his senior career with Rangers in Scotland.

Career

Club
He made his debut for Podbeskidzie in a 1–1 draw against Radomiak Radom on 22 July 2017.

On 3 February 2020, Wiktorski signed for Chojniczanka Chojnice until 30 June 2020.

Honours
Rangers FC
Scottish League Two: 2012–13

References

External links 
 
 

1993 births
Living people
Sportspeople from Bydgoszcz
Polish footballers
Association football defenders
Zawisza Bydgoszcz players
Scottish Professional Football League players
Rangers F.C. players
I liga players
Ząbkovia Ząbki players
Zagłębie Sosnowiec players
Podbeskidzie Bielsko-Biała players
Chojniczanka Chojnice players
Liga II players
FC Dunărea Călărași players
FC Gloria Buzău players
Polish expatriate footballers
Polish expatriate sportspeople in Scotland
Expatriate footballers in Scotland
Polish expatriate sportspeople in Romania
Expatriate footballers in Romania